Khaykin is a surname. Notable people with the surname include:
Boris Khaykin (1904–1978), Russian conductor
Elizabeth Khaykin, Georgian-American epidemiologist
Nikita Khaykin (born 1995), Russian-Israeli footballer
Yaariv Khaykin, Canadian cardiologist and clinical researcher